WYNG is a radio station licensed to Mount Carmel, Illinois and serving the Evansville, Indiana market at 94.9 FM. The current format is Educational Media Foundation's Christian contemporary K-Love.

History
WYNG acquired the 94.9 frequency in 2003 when the Regent Broadcasting changed frequencies and adopted a Country format. After stations WBKR and WKDQ were acquired from Clear Channel Communications by Regent Broadcasting, Regent decided to change WYNG's programming to an all Sports format – primarily using ESPN Radio syndicated programming.

On August 25, 2006, Regent sold WYNG to Withers Broadcasting Companies, a Mount Vernon, Illinois company that operates multiple radio/television stations in several states, including Kentucky, West Virginia, and Missouri.

ESPN's format was dropped as of January 1, 2007 and the ESPN affiliation moved to WYFX 106.7. Long time WGBF/WYNG sportscaster Dan Egierski is now Vice President of Evansville Sports Programming Inc., which is active in sales for WYFX.

WVMC (AM) has been added to their line-up of stations.

On January 11, 2016, WYNG, LLC. sold WYNG to EMF Broadcasting for $450,000 along with Iowa stations KOKX-FM and KRNQ; EMF flipped the station to its K-Love network upon the sale's closure on March 18, 2016.

Non-music operations
WYNG has an extensive news department providing news at the top of the hour between 6 A.M. and 6 P.M. However, most of the updates are not live. The transcript of the report is posted on their website daily. WYNG is a part of the St. Louis Cardinals radio network.

Previous logos

References

External links

 History of WYNG

Contemporary Christian radio stations in the United States
K-Love radio stations
Educational Media Foundation radio stations
YNG (FM)